Kaarel Kilvet (13 July 1944 Pärnu – 30 April 2005 Tallinn) was an Estonian actor, singer and director.

In 1970 he graduated from Tallinn State Conservatory's Performing Arts Department. 1970-1993 he was an actor and director in Estonian Youth Theatre. 1993-1998 he was a director in Endla Theatre. Since 1998 he was a freelancer.

He was a member of the folk music groups Kukerpillid and Leegajus, and a founder and member of the folk and comedy musical trio Hampelmann, with Jüri Aarma and Lauri Nebel.

Besides stage roles he appeared also in several films and in radio theatre.

Awards:
 2005: Order of the White Star, V class.

Filmography
 1972: Verekivi (feature film; role: the gate guard)
 1981: Nukitsamees (feature film, music film;)
 1994: Jüri Rumm (feature film; role: musician)
 1998: Mõmmi ja aabits. 20 aastat hiljem (television series; director)

References

1944 births
2005 deaths
Estonian male stage actors
Estonian male film actors
20th-century Estonian male actors
Estonian male radio actors
Estonian theatre directors
20th-century Estonian male singers
Estonian musicians
Recipients of the Order of the White Star, 5th Class
Estonian Academy of Music and Theatre alumni
People from Pärnu
Burials at Metsakalmistu